St Mary's Island may refer to:

Places
England
 St Mary's Island, Kent, in Medway
 St Mary's Island, River Thames, in the county of Berkshire
 St Mary's Island (Tyne and Wear), in the metropolitan county of Tyne and Wear
 St Mary's, Isles of Scilly, in the county of Cornwall

India
 St. Mary's Islands, in the state of Karnataka

Isle of Man
 St Mary's Isle, Douglas Bay

Madagascar
 Île Sainte-Marie, also known as St Mary's Island in English, in the region of Analanjirofo

The Gambia
 Another name for Banjul Island, in Banjul division